The Sofia public bus system forms part of the public transport network of Sofia, the capital city of Bulgaria.

In operation since 1935, the system presently comprises 98 routes.

History
The public bus transport in Sofia developed relatively late compared to the other types of transport in the city. The first operational line was opened on 20 April 1935. Soon after that six more lines were opened, bringing the total network length to 23 km.
 
During the communist era, the bus fleet consisted mainly of Ikarus and Bulgarian-made Chavdar buses. After the political changes in 1989, however, the fleet has gradually been modernised.

Lines
As of September 2022, the following bus lines in Sofia are in service:

Night bus
A night bus service was launched in Sofia by Sofia Urban Mobility Center on an experimental basis from 7 April 2018 until 31 December 2018. Four routes were included (N1, N2, N3 and N4) and operated from 00:20 until 04:20 at intervals of 40 mins. Tickets for the night bus could be obtained solely from conductors on the bus, and not from the driver, machines or other public transport ticket sale points. Tickets for the night bus cost 2 leva compared to the daytime price of 1.60 leva. Knyaz Alexander Square was chosen as the site of a transfer location where all night bus lines met and passengers could switch lines. As of February 2023, the service isn't running and the last bus for most lines is between 23:30 and 00:00.

Fleet

Current fleet 
 Sofia Bus Transport

 Sofia Electric Transport

 MTK Group

Heritage fleet

See also

Sofia Metro
Sofia Public Transport
Sofia Tramway
Trolleybuses in Sofia

References

Transport in Sofia
Sofia